Streptomyces termitum is a bacterium species from the genus of Streptomyces which has been isolated from termites.

See also 
 List of Streptomyces species

References

Further reading

External links
Type strain of Streptomyces termitum at BacDive -  the Bacterial Diversity Metadatabase	

termitum
Bacteria described in 1951